ThetaHealing (also Theta Healing) is the registered trademark for a method of meditation created by Vianna Stibal in 1995. ThetaHealing claims to change a practitioner's brain wave pattern to the theta pattern, allowing them to explore how "emotional energy" affects their health, and develop "natural intuition".

ThetaHealing is considered a pseudoscientific practice.

Process 

ThetaHealing is usually administered in the form of individual sessions in which the practitioner sits directly opposite the person, and initially attends to the person by listening and using probing questions. They may conduct a session long-distance through telephone or over the internet via webcam and voice. The ThetaHealing technique is based on the idea that the beliefs in a person's conscious and unconscious mind directly impact their emotional well-being, which may impact their physical health. The ThetaHealing technique is always taught to be used in conjunction with conventional medicine.

Its website claims that practitioners and instructors of the technique are found all over the globe.

Philosophy 
ThetaHealing's philosophy is what Vianna Stibal, an American naturopath, calls "the seven planes of existence". According to her, these levels of existence build a framework to show the importance of the "Creator of all that is” (whose upper level is also described as the "Place of perfect love"). In addition, practitioners and instructors of the technique are open to everyone, regardless of the person's origin or religion. Stibal states that she has "facilitated her own instant healing from cancer", that ThetaHealing can reduce HIV, and that she believes it can make an amputated leg grow back.

Criticism 
The philosophy of ThetaHealing has been criticized due to its esoteric and faith-based nature as well as an overwhelming lack of evidence of the effectiveness of the methods. The ThetaHealing method has also been criticized as "criminal" and "not supported by any kind of evidence" by Edzard Ernst. The McGill University Office for Science and Society pointed out that ThetaHealing did not increase theta wave activity, but that "It did the exact opposite. Theta activity overall went down".

ThetaHealing often employs the method of applied kinesiology, after putting patients into a deep meditation. Even the practice of applied kinesiology has been highly criticized and studies have shown that it lacks clinical value.
ThetaHealing also has been widely criticized as being motivated by money, not wellness. In order to enroll in a ThetaHealing course that teaches how "money is an illusion", you must pay a total of seven hundred and fifty dollars. Other ThetaHealing courses include classes which teach how to "activate the 12 strands of DNA within each participant", despite the fact that DNA is not separated into 12 strands.

See also 
List of esoteric healing articles

References

External links
Official website

Meditation
Energy therapies
New Age practices
Concepts in alternative medicine
1995 introductions